The New Zealand women's Under-20 Football Team, informally known as the 'Junior Football Ferns', is the representative team for New Zealand in international Under-20 football.

History

Fixtures and results

2022

Coaching staff

Current squad
The following players were named to the squad for the 2022 FIFA U-20 Women's World Cup.

Competitive record

OFC U-20 Women's Championship

FIFA U-20 Women's World Cup

FIFA U-20 Women's World Cup match history

2006

2008

2010

2012

2014

2016

2018

2022

References

External links
 NZ Football page
 Ultimate NZ Soccer page

Under20
Oceanian women's national under-20 association football teams